Kit Chambers (born 22 April 1949) is a New Zealand cricketer. He played in one first-class match for Canterbury in 1973–74.

See also
 List of Canterbury representative cricketers

References

External links
 

1949 births
Living people
New Zealand cricketers
Canterbury cricketers
Cricketers from Christchurch